Shaun Boyle (born 30 January 1971) is an Australian skeleton racer who competed from 2001 to 2006. He finished 22nd in the men's skeleton event at the 2006 Winter Olympics in Turin.

Boyle's best finish at the FIBT World Championships was 22nd in the men's skeleton event at Calgary in 2005.

Since 2006, Boyle has competed for Australia in bobsleigh.

External links
2006 men's skeleton results
FIBT bobsleigh profile
FIBT skeleton profile
Skeletonsport profile

1971 births
Australian male bobsledders
Australian male skeleton racers
Living people
Sportspeople from Wollongong
Skeleton racers at the 2006 Winter Olympics
Olympic skeleton racers of Australia
20th-century Australian people
21st-century Australian people